Roy Freiman (born April 30, 1959) is an American Democratic Party politician who has represented the 16th Legislative District in the New Jersey General Assembly since 2018, replacing Jack Ciattarelli, who did not seek re-election to his seat to run unsuccessfully for Governor of New Jersey in the 2017 primaries.

Personal life 
A resident of Hillsborough Township, Freiman graduated from the State University of New York at Oneonta with a bachelor's degree in business finance and attended Brunel University London. He is a Chartered Life Underwriter and Chartered Financial Consultant. He worked for more than 20 years at Prudential Financial, where he was a vice president of strategy and analytics. Freiman served in 2017 on the Hillsborough Township Sustainability Committee.

New Jersey Assembly 
In the November 2017 general election, with Jack Ciattarelli leaving the Assembly in his unsuccessful run for the gubernatorial nomination, Freiman (with 32,714 votes; 26.0% of all ballots cast) and his running mate, incumbent Andrew Zwicker (with 34,233; 27.2%), defeated Republican challengers Mark Caliguire (29,041; 23.1%) and Donna Simon (29,674; 23.6%) to win both Assembly seats from the district for the Democrats.

Committees 
Committee assignments for the current session are:
Agriculture and Food Security, Chair
Commerce and Economic Development
Financial Institutions and Insurance

District 16 
Each of the 40 districts in the New Jersey Legislature has one representative in the New Jersey Senate and two members in the New Jersey General Assembly. The representatives from the 16th District for the 2022—23 Legislative Session are:
 Senator Andrew Zwicker  (D)
 Assemblyman Roy Freiman  (D)
 Assemblywoman Sadaf Jaffer  (D)

Electoral history

Assembly

References

External links
Legislative webpage

1959 births
Living people
Alumni of Brunel University London
Democratic Party members of the New Jersey General Assembly
People from Hillsborough Township, New Jersey
Politicians from Somerset County, New Jersey
State University of New York at Oneonta alumni
21st-century American politicians